Aranya may refer to:

Aranya (film) or Kaadan, a 2021 Indian drama film
Aranya (poetry), 1988 collection of poetry by Naresh Mehta 
Aranya, 1970 Assamese film by Samarendra Narayan Deb
Swami Hariharananda Aranya (1869-1947), yogi, author and founder of monastery

See also
Araṇya-Kāṇḍa (The forest episode), chapter of Hindi epic poem Rāmcaritmānas
Aranyaka Parva, section of Vana Parva, 18th book of Mahabharata